The 26th Massachusetts General Court, consisting of the Massachusetts Senate and the Massachusetts House of Representatives, met in 1805 and 1806 during the governorship of Caleb Strong. Harrison Gray Otis served as president of the Senate and Timothy Bigelow served as speaker of the House.

Senators

Representatives

See also
 9th United States Congress
 List of Massachusetts General Courts

References

External links
 . (Includes data for state senate and house elections in 1805)
 
 
 
 

Political history of Massachusetts
Massachusetts legislative sessions
massachusetts
1805 in Massachusetts
massachusetts
1806 in Massachusetts